Kaestlea beddomii, also known commonly as Beddome's ground skink, is a species of lizard in the family Scincidae. The species is endemic to the Western Ghats of India.

Etymology
K. beddomii is named after Richard Henry Beddome, a British army officer and botanist.

Habitat

Reproduction
The mode of reproduction of K. beddomii is unknown.

References

Further reading
Boulenger GA (1887). Catalogue of the Lizards in the British Museum (Natural History). Second Edition. Volume III. ... Scincidæ .... London: Trustees of the British Museum (Natural History). (Taylor and Francis, printers). xiii + 497 pp. + Plates I–XL. (Lygosoma beddomii, new species, p. 261 + Plate XVIII, figures 3 & 3a).
Boulenger GA (1890). The Fauna of British India, Including Ceylon and Burma. Reptilia and Batrachia. London: Secretary of State for India in Council. (Taylor and Francis, printers). xviii + 541 pp. (Lygosona beddomii, pp. 203–204).
Eremchenko VK, Das I (2004). "Kaestlea: a new genus of scincid lizards (Scincidae: Lygosominae) from the Western Ghats, south-western India". Hamadryad 28 (1 & 2): 43–50. (Kaestlea beddomii, new combination).
Greer AE (1974). "The generic relationships of the lizard genus Leiolopisma and its relatives". Australian Journal of Zoology, Supplement 31: 1–67. (Scincella beddomi, new combination).
Smith MA (1935). The Fauna of British India, Including Ceylon and Burma. Reptilia and Amphibia. Vol. II.—Sauria. London: Secretary of State for India in Council. (Taylor and Francis, printers). xiii + 440 pp. + Plate I + 2 maps. ("Lygosoma beddomei [sic]", p. 305).
Venugopal PD (2010). "An updated and annotated list of Indian lizards (Reptilia: Sauria) based on a review of distribution records and checklists of Indian reptiles". Journal of Threatened Taxa 2 (3): 725–738. ("Kaestlea beddomei [sic]", p. 731).

Kaestlea
Reptiles of India
Endemic fauna of the Western Ghats
Reptiles described in 1887
Taxa named by George Albert Boulenger